Sicignano may refer to:

 Sicignano (surname), an Italian habitational surname that evolved from the Latin word Sicinianus
 Sicignano degli Alburni, a comune in the province of Salerno in the Campania region of southern Italy
 Vincenzo Sicignano, an Italian football (soccer) goalkeeper